Benito is an unincorporated urban community in the Municipality of Swan Valley West, Manitoba, Canada.

Prior to 1 January 2015, Benito was designated as a village. To the south is Duck Mountain Provincial Park and Forest, to the north is Thunder Hill and further north of Swan River is Porcupine Mountain Provincial Park.

Benito has a large farming sector; its economic base is agriculture and logging.

History 
People from Eastern Canada, England, and Europe first settled Benito around the beginning of the 20th century. In 1905, the Canadian National Railway went through, and Benito slowly grew and was incorporated as a village in 1941.

On 1 April 2013, Benito was featured in an April Fool's Day joke across the Province of Manitoba. The CJ Radio Network announced that as part of a protest against forced municipal amalgamation, Benito had joined Saskatchewan. Staff at the former village office went along with the prank and informed callers that they were indeed now known as Benito, Saskatchewan, instead of Benito, Manitoba.

On 1 January 2015, the Village of Benito and the Rural Municipality of Swan River amalgamated to form the Municipality of Swan Valley West.

Demographics 

Transportation 
Benito is served by PTH 83.

Attractions 
Benito is home to a branch of the North-West Regional Library of nearby Swan River. Founded in 1965, today the North-West Regional Library Benito Branch provides over 14,000 books, DVDs, puzzles and other items accessible to the public as well as many other services.

Notable people 
Ed Werenich, world champion curler, known as "The Wrench",

References

External links 
  (2011)

Designated places in Manitoba
Unincorporated communities in Parkland Region, Manitoba
Unincorporated urban communities in Manitoba
Former villages in Manitoba
Populated places disestablished in 2015
2015 disestablishments in Manitoba